

Group A

Head coach:  Renê Simões

Head coach:  Martin Novoselac

Head coach:  Ange Postecoglou

Head coach:  Sérgio Farias

Group B

Head coach:  John Ellinger

Head coach:  Kozo Tashima

(*19)Kota Sugiyama MF Shimzu S Pulse 24 January 1985 (*20)Tomoya Osawa MF Omiya Ardija 22 October 1985.

Head coach:  Jean-François Jodar

Head coach:  Abdullahi Musa

Group C

Head Coach:  John Adshead

Head coach:  Juan Santisteban

Head coach:  Hugo Tocalli

Head Coach:  Michel Jacques Yameogo

Group D

Head coach:  Sekou Diallo

Head coach:  Eduardo Villalba

Head coach:  Hamid Derakhshan

Head coach:  Juan Diego Quesada

Footnotes

Fifa U-17 World Championship Squads, 2001
FIFA U-17 World Cup squads